Bunny is a colloquial term for a rabbit.

Bunny may also refer to:

People
 Bunny (surname)
 Bunny (nickname)
 Bunny, pseudonym of Carl E. Schultze (1866–1939), American newspaper cartoonist
 Bunny Meyer (born 1985), American YouTube personality
 Lady Bunny (born 1962), American drag queen
 Goddess Bunny (1960–2021), American drag queen
 Bad Bunny (born 1994), Puerto Rican rapper and singer

Characters

 Bunny (Harvey Comics), a Harvey Comics character
 Barnaby "Bunny" Brooks Jr., a character in the television show Tiger & Bunny
 Bugs Bunny, a cartoon character
 Bunny (Lexx), a character on the television series Lexx
 Bunny (Powerpuff Girls), a one-time character on the TV series Powerpuff Girls
 Bunny (Sailor Moon) or Sailor Moon, the main character in Sailor Moon media
 Bunny, a character in the comics with Zachary Zatara of the DC Universe 
 Bunny, a character in the film Platoon
 Bunny, a character in the film Toy Story 4
 Bunny, a character in the novel series MythAdventures, by Robert Asprin
 Bunny, a character in the television series Eldorado
 Bunny, a character in the television series As the World Turns
 Bunny, the main character in the short film Big Buck Bunny
 Bunny, the main character in the television series Untalkative Bunny
 Bunny Bravo, a character in the television series Johnny Bravo
 Bunny Corcoran (aka Edmund Corcoran), a character in the novel The Secret History
 Bunny Halper, a character in the television series The Danny Thomas Show
 Bunny Lebowski (aka Bunny LaJoya), a character in the film The Big Lebowski
 Bunny Manders, a character in the short stories about A. J. Raffles
 Bunny the makeup lady, a character on the American sketch comedy TV series Don't Look Now
 Bunny Watson, a protagonist played by Katharine Hepburn in the film Desk Set
 Bunny Wigglesworth, a character in the film Zorro, The Gay Blade
 Buster Bunny, a character in the animated television series Tiny Toon Adventures
 Howard "Bunny" Colvin, a character in the television show The Wire
 Bunny Swan, Chinese character on Madtv played by Alex Borstein

Entertainment
 Bunny (1998 film), an animated short
 Bunny (2005 film), a Telugu-language film
 Bunny (play), a play by Norman Krasna
 Bunny (Halo Circus album)
 Bunny (webcomic)
 Bunny (YuiKaori album)
 Bunny (Mona Awad novel), a novel by Mona Awad

Place names
 Bunny, Nottinghamshire, England, a village and civil parish
 Bunny Park, a children's park with rabbits in Benoni, Gauteng, South Africa
 Bunny park, the local name for Brent Lodge Park and Animal Centre, in Hanwell, England

Other uses
 Bunny, a term used in the sport of cricket, meaning an incompetent batsman
 Bunny, a local term for a chine or coastal valley in Hampshire, England
 Bunny, or Bunny chow, a fast food dish in South African cuisine
 Bunny, or Playboy Bunny, a waitress at a Playboy Club

See also
 Easter Bunny, a mythological rabbit or hare bringing Easter eggs in Western culture
 Bunnies!!!, a 2015 picture book
 Bunney, a surname
 Bunnie Holbert, Miss Arkansas 1977
Bunnings